Japonactaeon punctostriatus, common names Adam's baby bubble and pitted baby-bubble, is a species of minute sea snail or "bubble snail", a marine gastropod mollusk or micromollusk in the family Acteonidae, the "barrel bubble" snails.

Distribution 
This species occurs in the Western Atlantic Ocean: Florida, Gulf of Mexico, Mexico, Caribbean Sea, Venezuela.

Shell description
This barrel bubble snail has an ovate white shell with shouldered whorls. The body whorl has 10 -14 slightly irregular spiral grooves. The columella is twisted. The aperture is ovate and is rounded above and below.

The shell length is 3 – 7.5 mm. The maximum recorded shell length is 7.5 mm.

Ecology

Habitat 
Minimum recorded depth is 0 m. Maximum recorded depth is 110 m. This snail is found in mud or sand.

Life cycle 
The eggs are laid in a spiral string, enclosed in a mucus tube.

References

External links 

Acteonidae
Gastropods described in 1840